Julián Bottaro (born 28 September 1992) is an Argentine footballer who plays for Laos side Young Elephants as a forward.

Honours
Penang
Malaysia Premier League: 2020

References

External links
 

1992 births
Living people
Argentine footballers
Footballers from Buenos Aires
Argentine expatriate footballers
Expatriate footballers in Malaysia
Association football forwards
Club Atlético Huracán footballers
Penang F.C. players